Hassan Al-Ali may refer to:
 Hassan Al-Ali (Scouting)
 Hassan Al-Ali (footballer)